William Jared Hughes (born July 4, 1985) is an American former professional baseball relief pitcher. He made his Major League Baseball (MLB) debut in 2011 with the Pittsburgh Pirates. He also played for the Milwaukee Brewers, Cincinnati Reds, Philadelphia Phillies, and New York Mets.

Amateur career
Born in Stamford, Connecticut, Hughes was raised in San Marino, California and attended Santa Margarita Catholic High School. He was drafted by the Tampa Bay Devil Rays in the 16th round of the 2003 Major League Baseball draft, but chose to attend Santa Clara University. After the 2004 season, Hughes transferred to California State University, Long Beach, where he was a starting pitcher for two seasons in 2005 and 2006 and posted a 16–7 record with a 3.29 earned run average (ERA), pitching 197 innings with 164 strikeouts. In 2005, he played collegiate summer baseball for the Chatham A's of the Cape Cod Baseball League and was named a league all-star.

Professional career

Pittsburgh Pirates
Hughes was drafted by the Pittsburgh Pirates in the fourth round of the 2006 Major League Baseball draft. He started his professional career as a starting pitcher in 2006 with the Williamsport Crosscutters and the Hickory Crawdads. He spent the 2007 season with Hickory, where he was 8–9 with a 4.64 ERA, and led the league with 27 wild pitches in  innings.

He spent the 2008 season with the Lynchburg Hillcats and the Altoona Curve. He led the league in wild pitches. In 2009, Hughes pitched for the Gulf Coast League Pirates and Altoona, and was a combined 1–6 with three saves and an ERA of 3.61.

In 2010, Hughes pitched for Altoona, and was Pitcher of the Week in the Eastern League on May 17. For the season he was 12–8, and his 12 wins tied for the second-most in the league, were the third-most in a season in club history, and tied for first among all Pittsburgh minor leaguers. He also led the league in wild pitches, with 15 in  innings.  Hughes started the 2011 season in the Altoona rotation, but was promoted and moved to the bullpen with the Triple-A League Indianapolis Indians. Between the two teams in 2011, he was 6–5 with a 3.28 ERA in 48 games (11 starts) covering  innings.

When Hughes was promoted to the majors in September 2011, he became the 41st major leaguer in Long Beach history. He appeared in 12 games, going 0–1 with a 4.09 ERA.

On April 25, 2012, Hughes was recalled from Triple-A League Indianapolis. A day later he was optioned back but recalled again on May 1. On August 12, Hughes was optioned back to Indianapolis to make room for Juan Cruz coming off the disabled list. He was recalled again on August 14. Hughes finished the season with 66 appearances, going 2–2 with two saves and a 2.85 ERA. He led National League rookie relief pitchers in ERA, and was second in both games and innings pitched.

The 2013 season was a setback for Hughes, as he battled injuries and inconsistency throughout the year, with a 2–3 record in 29 appearances and a 4.78 ERA. As a result, he also spent time in the Triple-A League again, pitching in 18 games, with a record of 1–0 with two saves and an ERA of 0.43 in 21 innings.

In 2014 Hughes pitched in 63 games and posted a 7–5 record, with a 1.96 ERA. In  innings, he allowed 51 hits and 1.09 walks plus hits per inning pitched.

The 2015 season was another successful one for Hughes, as he put together a 3–1 record in a career-high 76 games (5th in the National League), with a 2.28 ERA and 1.33 walks plus hits per inning pitched.

In 2016, he was 1–1 with one save and had an ERA of 3.03 in 67 games for the Pirates. In  innings, he struck out 34 batters.

Hughes was released on March 29, 2017.

Milwaukee Brewers
Hughes signed a one-year contract with the Milwaukee Brewers on April 2, 2017. In his season in Milwaukee, he posted an ERA of 3.02 in 67 games. He was 5–3 with one save in  innings.

Cincinnati Reds
On December 26, 2017, Hughes signed a two-year contract with the Cincinnati Reds, with a $3 million club option or a $250,000 buyout for 2020. In his first season in Cincinnati, in 2018 Hughes posted a career-low 1.94 ERA (fourth-best in the majors among pitchers who threw at least 78 innings) and 1.017 walks plus hits per inning pitched during 72 appearances covering  innings. He finished 4–3 with 7 saves.

In the seven seasons from 2012–18, his 2.66 ERA ranked fourth-best among major league relief pitchers who made at least 440 appearances, behind only Craig Kimbrel (1.94), Kenley Jansen (2.21), and Tony Watson (2.56), and among relievers he tied for second with 65 batters grounding into 65 double plays, behind Brad Ziegler (86), tied with Jim Johnson (65), and 10th with a ground ball rate of 62.0%.

In the first part of 2019, before he was put on waivers, Hughes was 3–4 with one save and a 4.10 ERA in 47 appearances covering  innings.

Philadelphia Phillies
On August 15, 2019, Hughes was claimed off waivers by the Philadelphia Phillies. On August 17 Hughes made his debut against the San Diego Padres. In 2019 for the Phillies, he was 2–1 with a 3.91 ERA in 25 relief appearances covering 23 innings. As of 2019 he had the best range factor per 9 innings of active pitchers, at 2.69.

Houston Astros
On February 17, 2020, the Astros signed Hughes to a minor league contract. He was released on March 19.

New York Mets
On June 30, 2020, Hughes signed with the New York Mets. He appeared as a relief pitcher in 18 games for them, winning one and losing two, striking out 21 batters in  innings.  He became a free agent again after the season ended.

On February 14, 2021, Hughes announced his retirement from professional baseball after 10 major league seasons.

Personal life
Hughes is married to Kelly Hughes. They married in 2011. The couple have a son, William, who was born in 2016. Hughes is a Christian.

References

External links

1985 births
Living people
Pittsburgh Pirates players
Milwaukee Brewers players
Cincinnati Reds players
Philadelphia Phillies players
New York Mets players
Santa Clara Broncos baseball players
Long Beach State Dirtbags baseball players
Chatham Anglers players
Williamsport Crosscutters players
Hickory Crawdads players
Lynchburg Hillcats players
Altoona Curve players
Scottsdale Scorpions players
Gulf Coast Pirates players
Indianapolis Indians players
Baseball players from Connecticut
Baseball players from California
Major League Baseball pitchers
Sportspeople from Stamford, Connecticut